Keith Ireland Notary (born January 22, 1960) is an American former competitive sailor and Olympic silver medalist. He was born in Merritt Island, Florida.

Career
At the 1992 Summer Olympics, Notary finished in 2nd place in the tornado along with his partner Randy Smyth.

References

 

1960 births
American male sailors (sport)
Sailors at the 1992 Summer Olympics – Tornado
Olympic silver medalists for the United States in sailing
Living people
Medalists at the 1992 Summer Olympics
People from Merritt Island, Florida